George Street Bridge  is a crossing of the River Usk in the community of Victoria in Newport, South Wales. It is a Grade II* listed structure.

Opening 
It was opened on 9 April 1964 and is the first cable-stayed bridge in the United Kingdom. 

Before its opening in 1964 the only crossings of the river Usk in central Newport were the Newport Bridge carrying the main A48 road and Newport Transporter Bridge.

Many grand names were proposed for the bridge but it was eventually named after the relatively small George Street on the western bank of the River Usk.

Planning 

Originally the bridge was planned to be six lanes wide, but with the M4 motorway Usk bridge already planned further upstream it was reduced to four lanes.

Continuing developments 

On completion, the A48 route was diverted over the new bridge, making it the preferred route for through traffic. However, in 2004 the new City Bridge on the Southern Distributor Road further downstream became the preferred route and assumed the route number.

See also
List of bridges in Wales

References

External links

Cable-stayed bridges in Wales
Bridges completed in 1964
Bridges in Newport, Wales
Grade II* listed buildings in Newport, Wales
Grade II* listed bridges in Wales
Landmarks in Newport, Wales
Road bridges in Wales